Sprouty-related, EVH1 domain-containing protein 1 (Spread-1) is a protein that in humans is encoded by the SPRED1 gene located on chromosome 15q13.2 and has seven coding exons.

Function 

SPRED-1 is a member of the Sprouty family of proteins and is phosphorylated by tyrosine kinase in response to several growth factors. The encoded protein can act as a homodimer or as a heterodimer with SPRED2 to regulate activation of the MAP kinase cascade.

Clinical associations

Defects in this gene are a cause of neurofibromatosis type 1-like syndrome (NFLS).

Mutations in this gene are associated with
 Legius syndrome.
 Childhood leukemia

Mutations

The following mutations have been observed:
 An exon 3 c.46C>T mutation leading to p.Arg16Stop.  This mutation may result in a truncated nonfunctional protein.  Blast cells analysis displayed the same abnormality as germline mutation with one mutated allele (no somatic SPRED1 single-point mutation or loss of heterozygosity was found). The M4/M5 phenotype of AML are most closely associated with Ras pathway mutations.  Ras pathway mutations are also associated with monosomy 7.
 3 Nonsense (R16X, E73X, R262X)
 2 Frameshift (c.1048_c1049 delGG, c.149_1152del 4 bp)
 Missense (V44D)
 p.R18X and p.Q194X with phenotype altered pigmentation without tumoriginesis.

Disease Database
SPRED1 gene variant database

See also 

 Neurofibromin 1
 Patients without Neurofibromin 1 or SPRED1 mutations may have SPRED2, SPRED3 or SPRY1, SPRY2, SPRY3 or SPRY4 mutations.

References

Further reading 

 
 
 
 
 
 
 
 
 
 
 
 
 
 
 

SPR domain
EVH1 domain
Human proteins
Proteins
Hematopathology
Neuro-cardio-facial-cutaneous syndromes